Cadotte Airport  was located adjacent to Cadotte Lake, Alberta, Canada.

References

External links 
Place to Fly on COPA's Places to Fly airport directory

Defunct airports in Alberta
Northern Sunrise County